China National Highway 211 (G211) runs from Yinchuan in Ningxia to Xi'an in Shaanxi. It is 645 kilometres in length and runs southwest from Wuning in Ningxia and then turns southeast on a virtual straight line to Xi'an via primarily rural areas.

Route and distance

See also
 China National Highways

Transport in Ningxia
Transport in Gansu
Transport in Shaanxi
Transport in Xi'an
211